Abdul Aziz bin Ishak (1914–1999) was a Malaysian freedom fighter, politician and journalist.

Aziz was, in fact, the only member of the pre-war Kesatuan Melayu Muda (KMM) to have served in the 1955 and post-Merdeka Cabinets under Tunku Abdul Rahman. Between 1955 and 1963, he was the Minister for Agriculture and Co-operatives, where his efforts in rural development to improve the lives of padi farmers and fishermen were important although less known compared with similar efforts undertaken by the Rural Development Ministry.

Aziz remains an enigma unlike his brother Yusof Ishak who was well known both as a journalist and the founder of Utusan Melayu and as the first President of Singapore after the separation with Malaysia in 1965.

Early life
Born in 1914 the state of Perak, which was then part of the Federated Malay States, Aziz Ishak is the descendant of prominent Sumatran Malay Datuk Jannatun who migrated to Penang in 1759 or 15 years before Francis Light arrived on the island.

Aziz is of Minangkabau descent from his father's side while his mother is a native of Langkat regency in Indonesia. His brother is Yusof Ishak was the first President of Singapore and his face adorns the current paper currency of Singapore that is in circulation.

Denied entry into the Malay College Kuala Kangsar because of his non-aristocratic background, Aziz attended Victoria Bridge School (now Victoria School) and Raffles Institution in Singapore.

His time at Raffles was an important learning experience. He mixed well with students of various ethnic backgrounds and was the School Captain for two years, perhaps the only Malay to have held this distinction.

At Raffles, he formed a Malay literary association with friends including Hamid Jumaat, Tun Sardon Jubir and Ahmad Ibrahim and contributed articles on the Malays and their plight to Warta Malaya, a leading Malay newspaper in Singapore. This was done through his brother Yusof who was already working as a journalist.

Career

Colonial officer
Upon completing his Senior Cambridge, Aziz joined the colonial service in the Fisheries Department-based initially in Port Dickson in 1936, followed by Kuantan and then Batu Kurau where he was responsible for the northern region.

In Kuantan, his sympathy for the Malay fishermen did not go down well with officials, notably the English district officer, while in Kuala Kurau his immediate boss wanted him to read books on fisheries only and not literary works.

Journalism
Frustrated with British officialdom and after being unfairly accused of collaborating with the Japanese by his European boss (who was humiliated by the Japanese during 1942–45 and imprisoned in Changi), Aziz left the colonial service to join his brother Yusof Ishak after he founded Utusan Melayu.

It was through journalism that Aziz became widely known in Malaya. He wrote feature articles on UMNO, on the state and federal administrations and occasionally editorials.

Aziz was a member of the KMM while he was a fisheries officer in Kuala Kurau. In 1946, he and Abdul Samad Ismail formed Gerakan Angkatan Melayu Sedar (Geram), which was refused registration by the colonial authority. It was closely watched by the Special Branch. Geram was critical of the Malayan Union; it was also critical of UMNO because of the prominent role of the feudal aristocracy within the movement. Geram died a natural death when Aziz moved to Kuala Lumpur in 1948 as Utusan Melayu correspondent in the central region.

Aziz was the only journalist who was appointed a member of the Federal Legislative Council and he played an active role in its proceedings. In September 1951, he urged the government to declare an end to the Emergency.

Political involvement
Aziz's political involvement was varied. Before 1942, he was a member of the KMM and after 1945 sympathised with the PKMM. However, in 1950 he joined UMNO when it was still led by Datuk Onn Jaafar although his idea of full independence for Malaya at this time was neither acceptable to Onn nor the Tunku Abdul Rahman.

When the Independence of Malaya Party was formed in 1951 by Onn, Aziz became deputy chairman of the IMP's Kuala Lumpur branch and contested the 1952 elections in Sentul but lost to the Alliance candidate.

In the same year, he left the IMP due to personal differences with Onn. Upon the Tunku's encouragement, he rejoined UMNO in April 1953. Aziz then held important positions within Umno and the Alliance. In 1953, he was appointed to the Alliance Round Table Conference that called for an early general election in Malaya.

In 1955, he was appointed head of Selangor UMNO and chairman of the Selangor Alliance. He was very much involved in drafting the 1955 Alliance manifesto for the general election held that year; the manifesto covered issues such as Malay language, agriculture, economy, education, and finance.

In the elections, he stood on the Alliance ticket and won in Kuala Langat. He faced a Parti Negara candidate, a former schoolmate. Despite official backing for Parti Negara, including from the colonial police force, the Alliance went on to win the first national elections, taking 51 of the 52 seats.

Earlier in September 1954, Aziz had campaigned actively with the Tunku in the Terengganu election which was won by the Alliance despite open support for Parti Negara by the British.

Cabinet position
Aziz was appointed Minister of Agriculture and co-operatives, a post he kept until 1963. Tun Abdul Razak took note of Aziz's useful work among the rural folk, especially the setting up of co-operatives to eliminate the exploitation by middlemen.

The year 1955 saw a growing rift between Aziz with his Cabinet colleagues, notably the Tunku and Abdul Razak who was overall in charge of rural development. Aziz's blunt criticisms of ministers, such as the wearing of uniforms, did not endear him well with the Tunku. He was also unhappy at the Alliance's neglect of the 1955 manifesto due to the exuberant push for political independence.

In his memoirs, Aziz claimed that the 1955 Cabinet was beset with policy differences on various issues, including the replacement of expatriate British officers with Malayans or Malayanisation. Aziz was equally passionate on press freedom that he claimed had been eroded after 1955.

Aziz resigned from the Cabinet in 1963 after he was transferred to the Health Ministry. This was due to irreconcilable differences with the Tunku and other Cabinet colleagues on strategies for rural development. There was no place for a socialist in a Cabinet that was pursuing capitalistic policies and firmly committed to upholding a free-market economy. Soon after, he was expelled from UMNO.

Aziz eventually went on to form the short lived National Convention Party that joined the left wing Malayan Peoples' Socialist Front together with the Labour Party of Malaya and Partai Ra'ayat to contest the 1964 general elections.

Post-Cabinet
In 1963, soon after the outbreak of the Konfrontasi between Malaysia and Indonesia, the Alliance government began yet another massive round up of politicians and activists among the opposition under the Internal Security Act. Among those arrested and detained were Ahmad Boestaman, Ishak Haji Muhammad, Abdul Aziz Ishak (head of GERAM), Datuk Kampo Radjo (later the president of PRM), Tan Kai Hee, Tan Hock Hin, Dr. Rajakumar, Hasnul Hadi, Tajuddin Kahar and hundreds of others.

Aziz was accused of being a traitor and collaborating with Indonesian agents to form a government-in-exile, a charge that he denied. He was detained between 1965 and 1966 under the law.

In his book Special Guest: The Detention in Malaysia of an Ex-Cabinet Minister he describes in detail the irreconcilable differences with the Tunku and the events that led to his resignation, subsequent detention and release. The book was banned and only allowed restricted access in university libraries.

His earlier biographical account Katak Keluar dari Bawah Tempurong stopped at 1955 and his subsequent appointment as minister. As a result, not much is known about Aziz Ishak and his role in the struggle for independence through the newspaper Utusan Melayu and in the political arena when he was head of Selangor UMNO and Selangor Alliance in the mid-1950s when the political bargaining among the Alliance partners were struck.

He turned down all subsequent offers of state and federal awards.

References

 The 'unknown' Aziz Ishak, The Star, 6 August 2007.
 Aziz kept bucking his British bosses, The Star, 6 August 2007.

People from Perak
Minangkabau people
Malaysian Muslims
Malaysian people of Malay descent
Malaysian people of Minangkabau descent
Malaysian people of Indonesian descent
Government ministers of Malaysia
Victoria School, Singapore alumni
Raffles Institution alumni
1914 births
1999 deaths
United Malays National Organisation politicians
Members of the Dewan Rakyat
Malaysian political party founders
Malaysian socialists
Agriculture ministers of Malaysia
Health ministers of Malaysia